Snicket  may refer to:

 A narrow alleyway
 Lemony Snicket, pen name of American Daniel Handler, author of the A Series of Unfortunate Events novels

Characters
 Jacques Snicket, a character in the Series of Unfortunate Events series by author Lemony Snicket
 Kit Snicket, a character in the Series of Unfortunate Events series by author Lemony Snicket
 Lemony Snicket, a character in the Series of Unfortunate Events series by author Lemony Snicket